Olaf is an unincorporated community in Wright County, Iowa, United States.

History
Olaf's population was 57 in 1902, and 25 in 1925.

References 

Unincorporated communities in Wright County, Iowa
Unincorporated communities in Iowa